Daniel Miklasevich (born July 17, 1997) is an American rower. He competed in the men's eight event at the 2020 Summer Olympics.

References

External links
 
 Brown Bears bio

1997 births
Living people
American male rowers
Olympic rowers of the United States
Rowers at the 2020 Summer Olympics
Brown Bears rowers
Sportspeople from Pittsburgh
Central Catholic High School (Pittsburgh) alumni